Eenhoorn may refer to:

Eenhoorn (surname), list of people with the surname
De Eenhoorn, Haarlem, a paltrok mill in Haarlem, North Holland, Netherlands
De Eenhoorn (publisher), Flemish independent publishing house

See also
Unicorn (disambiguation)
Einhorn (surname)